The following highways are numbered 49:

Australia
 Queensland State Route 49
Wide Bay Highway
Bunya Highway
Moonie Highway
Balonne Highway
 Central Coast Highway

Canada
 Alberta Highway 49
 British Columbia Highway 49
 Manitoba Highway 49
 Highway 49 (Ontario)
 Saskatchewan Highway 49

Czech Republic
 D49 Motorway
 I/49 Highway; Czech: Silnice I/49

Hungary
  M49 expressway

India
  National Highway 49 (India)

Iran
Road 49

Japan
 Japan National Route 49

Korea, South
Gukjido 49

Namibia
C49 road (Namibia)

New Zealand
 New Zealand State Highway 49

United Kingdom
 British A49 (Ross on Wye-Bamber Bridge)
 British M49 (Severn Beach-Avonmouth)

United States
 Interstate 49
 U.S. Route 49
 Alabama State Route 49
 Arkansas Highway 49 (1926-1963) (former)
 California State Route 49
Colorado State Highway 49 (1967-1968) (former)
 Connecticut Route 49
 Florida State Road 49
 County Road 49 (Suwannee County, Florida)
 Georgia State Route 49
Idaho State Highway 49 (1930s) (former)
 Illinois Route 49
 Indiana State Road 49
 Iowa Highway 49 (former)
 K-49 (Kansas highway)
 Kentucky Route 49
 Louisiana Highway 49
 Maryland Route 49
 Massachusetts Route 49
 M-49 (Michigan highway)
 Minnesota State Highway 49 (former)
 County Road 49 (Ramsey County, Minnesota)
 Missouri Route 49 
 Montana Highway 49
 Nebraska Highway 49 (former)
 Nebraska Spur 49A
 Nebraska Spur 49B
 Nebraska Spur 49C
 Nevada State Route 49 (former)
 New Hampshire Route 49
 New Jersey Route 49
 County Route 49 (Bergen County, New Jersey)
 County Route S49 (Bergen County, New Jersey)
 County Route 49 (Monmouth County, New Jersey)
 County Route 49 (Ocean County, New Jersey)
 New York State Route 49
 County Route 49 (Allegany County, New York)
 County Route 49 (Cattaraugus County, New York)
 County Route 49 (Chautauqua County, New York)
 County Route 49 (Dutchess County, New York)
 County Route 49 (Erie County, New York)
 County Route 49 (Essex County, New York)
 County Route 49 (Genesee County, New York)
 County Route 49 (Orleans County, New York)
 County Route 49 (Otsego County, New York)
 County Route 49 (Putnam County, New York)
 County Route 49 (Rensselaer County, New York)
 County Route 49 (Rockland County, New York)
 County Route 49 (Schenectady County, New York)
 County Route 49 (St. Lawrence County, New York)
 County Route 49 (Suffolk County, New York)
 County Route 49 (Sullivan County, New York)
 County Route 49 (Washington County, New York)
 North Carolina Highway 49
 North Dakota Highway 49
 Ohio State Route 49
 Oklahoma State Highway 49
 Pennsylvania Route 49
 South Carolina Highway 49
 South Dakota Highway 49
 Tennessee State Route 49
 Texas State Highway 49
 Texas State Highway Loop 49
 Texas State Highway Spur 49 (former)
 Farm to Market Road 49
 Texas Park Road 49
 Utah State Route 49 (former)
 Virginia State Route 49
 West Virginia Route 49
 West Virginia Route 49 (1920s) (former)
 Wisconsin Highway 49

See also
A49 (disambiguation)